The 2007 Baltic League Final (officially known as the 2007 Triobet Baltic League Final) was the final of the first ever Baltic League. It was played on November 8 and November 11, 2007 between Latvian teams FK Ventspils and Liepājas Metalurgs. Liepājas Metalurgs won the two matches 8–2 (3–1 and 5–1) on aggregate.

Route to the final

Knockout stage

Match details

First leg

Second leg

External links
Official Baltic League Finals website

2007
Baltic League Final